The Bangladeshi taka (sign: , code: BDT, short form: Tk) is the currency of the People's Republic of Bangladesh.

Issuance of bank notes 10 and larger is controlled by Bangladesh Bank, while the 2 and 5 banknotes are the responsibility of the ministry of finance of the government of Bangladesh. The banknotes of Tk. 2 and Tk.5 have mostly been replaced by coins while lower denomination coins (including all poysha coins) up to Tk. 1 have almost gone out of circulation due to inflation. The most commonly used symbol for the taka is "" and "Tk", used on receipts while purchasing goods and services. It was formerly divided into 100 poysha, but poysha coins are no longer in circulation.

Etymology

According to The American Heritage Dictionary of the English Language and Banglapedia, the word taka came from the Sanskrit word tankah. The word taka in Bangla is also commonly used generically to mean any money, currency, or notes. Thus, colloquially, a person speaking in Bangla may use "taka" to refer to money regardless of what currency it is denominated in. This is also common in the Indian states of West Bengal and Tripura, where the official name of the Indian rupees is "taka" as well. In other eastern Indian languages with the influence of Prakrit in Bihar it is "taka" in Maithili and Magadhi languages, in Assam it is টকা tôka and it is ଟଙ୍କା taṅkā in Odisha.

History

1947–71

After the Partition of Bengal in 1947, East Bengal became the eastern wing of Pakistan and was renamed to East Pakistan in 1956. The Pakistani rupee also bore the word taka on official notes and coins. Bangla was one of the two national languages of the Pakistan union between 1956 and 1971 (the other being Urdu). The Bangladeshi taka came into existence since 1972, a year after the independence of the eastern wing of the union, as the independent nation of Bangladesh.

Prior to the Liberation war in 1971, banknotes of the State Bank of Pakistan circulated throughout Bangladesh, and continued to be used in Bangladesh even after independence for only about three months until the official introduction of the taka on 4 March 1972. During the war, it was an unofficial practice of some Bengali nationalists to protest Pakistani rule by stamping banknotes with "" and "BANGLA DESH" as two words in either Bangla or English. These locally produced stamps are known to exist in several varieties, as are forgeries. On 8 June 1971, the Pakistani government declared that all banknotes bearing such stamps ceased to be legal tender. Furthermore, to prevent looted high-denomination notes from disrupting the Pakistani economy, the government also withdrew the legal tender status of all 100- and 500-rupee notes.

Some foreign publications mention that there were rubber stamp "BANGLA DESH" overprints on different denominations of Pakistani bank notes during the a.m. period. Pakistani postage stamps were rubber-stamped and used all over Bangladesh until 30 March 1973, but Bangladesh Bank or the Ministry of Finance never issued an order to overprint or rubber-stamp Pakistani currency.

Since 1972
The taka was introduced in Bangladesh in 1972, replacing the Pakistani rupee at par.

Treasury banknotes

 The first treasury notes in 1972 for 1 and notes of the Bangladesh Bank for 5, 10 and 100.
 In 1977, banknotes for 50 were introduced, followed by 500 in 1979 and 20 in 1982.
 1 treasury notes were issued until 1992, with 2 treasury notes introduced in 1989.
 1000 banknotes were introduced in 2008.
 5 banknotes, previously issued by Bangladesh Bank, are now issued by the Government of Bangladesh. These have mostly been replaced by coins since the early 2000s.

Banknotes and issues

In 2000, the government issued polymer 10 notes as an experiment (similar to the Australian dollar). They proved unpopular, however, and were withdrawn later. At present, the 1 and 5 notes have mostly been replaced with coins, and in 2008, the government issued 1,000 notes.

In 2011, Bangladesh Bank began issuing a new series of banknotes denominated in 2, 5, 100, 500, and 1000. All are dated 2011 and feature a portrait and watermark of the Father of the Nation, Bangabandhu Sheikh Mujibur Rahman, along the National Martyr's Monument in Savar at center front.

From 2011, the Bangladesh Bank introduced new notes denominated in 10, 20, and 50 on 7 March 2012. The notes bear the portrait of Bangabandhu Sheikh Mujibur Rahman and the National Martyr's Monument in Savar on the front. On the back of the notes, the 10 will picture the Baitul Mukarram mosque, the 20 pictures the Shat Gombuj mosque in Bagherat, and the 50 notes feature Shilpacharjo Zainul Abedin's famous painting Ploughing.

On March 7 of 2019, Bangladesh Bank released new ৳100 notes, which had the same design as 2011 Version, but had better security, a stronger Blue and were made of a different material.

On December 15 of 2019, Bangladesh Bank issued new ৳50 banknotes, with the same design as the 2011 version, but had a different colour (orange, brown and fluorescent yellow-green), and a slightly different design in some parts.

On March 17 of 2020, Bangladesh Bank introduced new ৳200 notes. They bear a portrait of Bangabandhu Sheikh Mujibur Rahman on both sides and a landscape picture of a village, river and boats.

Commemorative banknotes

In 2011, Bangladesh Bank also introduced a 40 note to commemorate the "40th Victory Anniversary of Bangladesh". The commemorative note features a portrait of the Father of the Nation, Bangabandhu Sheikh Mujibur Rahman and the National Martyr's Monument in Savar on front, and six armed men on back. Curiously, this note has an electrotype 10 in the watermark, indicating it was likely printed on extra 10 banknote paper.

On 15 February 2012, Bangladesh Bank has introduced a 60 note to commemorate "60 years of National Movement". The commemorative note measures  and features the Shaeed Minar (Martyrs' monument) in Dhaka and five men on the back. Like the 40 commemorative note, this note has an electrotype 50 in the watermark. It was likely printed on extra 50 banknote paper.

On 26 January 2013, Bangladesh Bank issued a 25 note to commemorate the 25th anniversary (silver jubilee) of the Security Printing Corporation (Bangladesh) Ltd. On the front is the National Martyr's Monument in Savar, the designs of the previous series of the Bangladeshi taka notes and its postage stamps, three spotted deer and the magpie-robin (doyel). On the reverse is the headquarters of the Security Printing Corporation. Curiously, this note has an electrotype 10 in the watermark, indicating it was likely printed on extra 10 banknote paper.

On 8 July 2013, Bangladesh Bank issued a 100 note to commemorate the 100th anniversary of the Bangladesh National Museum. The commemorative note features an 18th-century terracotta plaque of a horseman on the front and the Bangladesh National Museum on the back.

Coins

In 1973, coins were introduced in denominations of 5, 10, 25 and 50 poysha. 1 poysha coins followed in 1974, with 1 coins introduced in 1975. The 1, 5 and 10 poysha were struck in aluminium, with the 25 and 50 poysha struck in steel and the 1 in copper-nickel. The 5 poysha were square with rounded corners, and the 10 poysha were scalloped. Steel 5 were introduced in 1994, and a steel 2 coin followed in 2004.

1 and 5 poysha coins are rarely found in circulation. The same is the case with the 10, 25, and 50 poysha coins, as they have lost value due to inflation over the years. Only the 1, 2 and 5 are regularly found in circulation. Unlike most other countries, coins are not issued every year, the most recent coins, 1, 2 and 5, were issued in 2013, 10 years ago.

Banknotes

First SeriesBangladesh introduced its first banknotes on 4 March 1972. At first 1 taka and 100 taka banknotes were introduced. Later 10 and 5 taka notes were added. This first issued series is commonly known as "Map Series". These banknotes are considered as emergency issue banknotes to replace the Pakistan rupee banknotes both with and without rubber stamp overprints.

Second Series After issuing the first banknotes, there were many conspiracy theories, counterfeiting problems and rumours, so the government issued the second series. These second series banknotes were printed by Thomas De La Rue of England. First-issued banknotes were subsequently withdrawn from circulation by 30 April 1974 after having ceased to hold legal tender status from 30 March 1974.

Third Series Bangladesh Government signed agreements with Thomas De La Rue and Bradbury Wilkinson at the same time. Both of them printed same denominations with different design almost at the same time. As a result, two different series were circulating at the same time.

Fourth Series During 1976 a completely new series of notes was introduced, with the exception of the 1-taka note, which was released as the second variety of the third issue during 1976. The notes of this issue are notable for the absence of the portrait of Sheikh Mujib, whose portrait had dominated all issues of the Bangladesh Bank until this issue. Instead of the familiar portrait, each note has an illustration of the Star Mosque on its front. 50 and 500 taka denomination was added in this series. 5,10,50 and 100 taka denominations were printed by Thomas De La Rue. 500 taka notes were printed by Giesecke and Devrient of Germany.

Fifth Series The fifth issue of banknotes was introduced over a two-year period from December 1977 to September 1979. The notes of this issue are very similar to those of the fourth issue; except the ‘Star Mosque’ was replaced on most notes by a new vignette and the colours of the notes are a little darker. There was no 500-taka note released in this issue, but a new denomination note of 20 taka was introduced on 20 August 1979, being the last note of this issue prepared by the Bangladesh Bank.

Sixth Series During the 1980s, some designs of taka notes were introduced, but most of the designs were the same. A new denomination of taka 2 note was also introduced. 10 and 50 takas were redesigned. Other denominations were the same as the previous series.

Seventh Series During the 90s newly designed banknotes of 10,50 and 500 taka were printed. 10 taka note had a portrait of Bangabandhu.

Eighth Series This series was printed between 2000 and 2001. A polymer banknote of denomination 10 was added, but later withdrawn due to lack of popularity. Paper notes of denomination 100 and 500 were printed with new designs. A portrait of Sheikh Mujibur Rahman was added on each new note replacing the National Martyrs’ Memorial Monument.

Ninth Series After a change in government new series of banknotes were introduced in 2002–2003. The portrait of Bangabandhu was absent in this series. In 2008, 1000 taka note was introduced for the first time.

Latest Issue of Each Banknote
The Bangladesh Bank has issued a new series of banknotes, phasing out the older designs for new, more secure ones. All banknotes other than the 1 taka feature a portrait of Sheikh Mujibur Rahman on the obverse along with the watermark of the National Martyrs’ Memorial.

Commemorative banknotes
The folder of the banknote for the 40th anniversary of the independence of Bangladesh had a spelling error of the name of the country. It was inserted as Bangldesh instead of Bangladesh.

Exchange rates

Historic exchange rates 

Upon Bangladesh's independence, the value of the Bangladeshi taka was set between ৳7.5 and ৳8.0 to US$1. Except for fiscal year 1978, the taka's value relative to the US dollar declined every year from 1971 through the end of 1987. To help offset this phenomenon, Bangladesh first used the compensatory financing facility of the International Monetary Fund in fiscal year 1974. Despite the increasing need for assistance, the Mujib government was initially unwilling to meet the IMF's conditions on monetary and fiscal policy. By fiscal year 1975, however, the government revised its stance, declaring a devaluation of the taka by 56 percent and agreeing to establishing the Bangladesh Aid Group by the World Bank.

Between 1980 and 1983, the taka sustained a decline of some 50 percent because of a deterioration in Bangladesh's balance of payments. Between 1985 and 1987, the taka was adjusted in frequent incremental steps, stabilising again around 12 percent lower in real terms against the US dollar, but at the same time narrowing the difference between the official rate and the preferential secondary rate from 15 percent to 7.5 percent. Accompanying this structural adjustment was an expansion in trade conducted at the secondary rate, to 53 percent of total exports and 28 percent of total imports. In mid-1987, the official rate was relatively stable, approaching less than ৳31 to US$1. In January 2011, US$1 was equivalent to approximately ৳72, as of 21 April 2012, US$1 was worth close to ৳82, and as of 9 September 2015 US$1 valued ৳77.

Current exchange rates

See also
 Economy of Bangladesh
 The Security Printing Corporation (Bangladesh) Ltd.

References

External links
 Bangladesh Bank's page on currencies in circulation 
 High resolution scans of Bangladeshi currency
 Historical banknotes of Bangladesh
 51 Years Of Taka History : Notes In Circulation

Economy of Bangladesh
Currencies of Bangladesh
Currencies of the Commonwealth of Nations
Currencies introduced in 1972